Eid is a former municipality in the county of Sogn og Fjordane, Norway. It was located in the traditional district of Nordfjord. The village of Nordfjordeid was the administrative center of the municipality. Other larger villages in Eid included Mogrenda, Stårheim, Haugen, Kjølsdalen, Heggjabygda, and Lote.

At the time of its dissolution in 2020, the  municipality is the 215th largest by area out of the 422 municipalities in Norway. Eid is the 168th most populous municipality in Norway with a population of 6,157.

Eid was known for its opera, fjord horses, shopping, and hiking opportunities. As in the rest of the region, agriculture was very important here, but trade and industry were also important. Frislid Konfeksjon (textiles) and the Hellesøy Nordfjord shipyard among others are located in Eid.

Nordfjordeid's schools include the folk high school, which offers courses linked to Fjord horses and provides the only circus education in Norway. There is also the Norwegian Fjord Horse Centre (Norsk Fjordhestsenter) in Eid. Its focus is in boosting the breed's standing in Norway and elsewhere.

General information

Eid was established as a municipality on 1 January 1838 (see formannskapsdistrikt law). The original municipality was identical to the Eid parish (prestegjeld) with the sub-parishes of Hornindal, Eid, and Stårheim.  On 1 January 1867, the eastern district of Hornindal was separated from Eid to form its own municipality. This split left the two remaining sub-parishes of the municipality of Eid with a population of 2,918.

During the 1960s, there were many municipal mergers across Norway due to the work of the Schei Committee. On 1 January 1965, the neighboring municipalities of Davik and Hornindal were dissolved and split up among their neighbors. Eid municipality gained all of Davik that was north of the Nordfjorden and east of and including the village of Lefdal. (Population in that area was 654.)  All of Hornindal municipality west of and including the villages of Navelsaker and Holmøyvik (population: 310) was also merged into Eid. After this merger, Eid's total population was 4,532.  At this point, Eid gained a third sub-parish from the former municipality of Davik: Kjølsdalen. Then on 1 January 1992, the village of Lote and its surrounding area (population: 152) was transferred from Gloppen Municipality to Eid.

On 1 January 2020, Eid Municipality ceased to exist when it was merged with the neighboring Selje Municipality and the Bryggja-Totland area of Vågsøy Municipality to form the new Stad Municipality.

Name
The name of the fjord is probably derived from a river name Aug, and this again is derived from the word öfugr which means "backwards". The actual river (now called Eidselva) meanders back and forth and from certain points it can seem to run backwards.

Coat of arms
The coat of arms were granted on 26 April 1986. The arms show the golden head of a fjord horse on a red background. The region is well known for its own race of horses, called the Fjording, that are very common and popular in the area. The Fjording is characterised by its white and black mane.

Churches
The Church of Norway had three parishes within the municipality of Eid. It is part of the Nordfjord prosti (deanery) in the Diocese of Bjørgvin.

Government
All municipalities in Norway, including Eid, are responsible for primary education (through 10th grade), outpatient health services, senior citizen services, unemployment and other social services, zoning, economic development, and municipal roads. The municipality is governed by a municipal council of elected representatives, which in turn elect a mayor.  The municipality falls under the Sogn og Fjordane District Court and the Gulating Court of Appeal.

Municipal council
The municipal council of Eid was made up of 29 representatives that were elected to four year terms. The party breakdown of the final municipal council was as follows:

Mayor
The mayor (ordførar) of a municipality in Norway is a representative of the majority party of the municipal council who is elected to lead the council. Alfred Bjørlo of the Liberal Party was elected mayor for the 2011–2015 term and was re-elected for the 2015–2019 term.

Geography

The municipality of Eid is located in the northernmost part of Sogn og Fjordane county. It is located along the northern shores of the Nordfjorden and it surrounds the Eidsfjorden branch off of the main Nordfjorden. Eid is bordered to the west by the municipality of Vågsøy, to the south by the municipalities of Bremanger and Gloppen, to the east by the municipalities of Stryn and Hornindal, and to the north by the municipalities of Volda and Vanylven in Møre og Romsdal county. Hornindalsvatnet, the deepest lake in Europe, is partially located in Eid municipality.

Notable people

Sophus Lie (1842–1899), mathematician
Azar Karadaş, football player
Harald Aabrekk, soccer coach

See also
List of former municipalities of Norway

References

External links

Municipal fact sheet from Statistics Norway 

 
Stad, Norway
Former municipalities of Norway
1838 establishments in Norway
2020 disestablishments in Norway